The governor of Minnesota is the head of government of the U.S. state of Minnesota. The governor is the head of the executive branch of Minnesota's state government and is charged with enforcing state laws.

There have been 41 governors of the state; one, Rudy Perpich, served non-consecutive terms. Minnesota Territory had three governors appointed by the President of the United States; the first, Alexander Ramsey, would later be state governor.

The current governor is Tim Walz, a member of the Democratic-Farmer-Labor Party, who took office on January 7, 2019.

Governors of Minnesota Territory

Minnesota Territory was organized on March 3, 1849.

Governors of the State of Minnesota
Minnesota was admitted to the Union on May 11, 1858. 

The Minnesota Constitution of 1858 created the offices of governor and lieutenant governor, elected separately to two-year terms; these were lengthened to four years starting in 1963. As of 1972, the governor and lieutenant governor are elected on the same ticket.

See also
List of Minnesota gubernatorial elections
List of lieutenant governors of Minnesota
First ladies and gentlemen of Minnesota

Notes

References
General

 
 
 
 

Specific

Lists of state governors of the United States
Governors of Minnesota
Governors
Governors